Portland is the name of some places in the U.S. state of Wisconsin:
Portland, Dodge County, Wisconsin, a town
Portland (community), Dodge County, Wisconsin, an unincorporated community
Portland, Monroe County, Wisconsin, a town
Portland (community), Monroe County, Wisconsin, an unincorporated community